Bar Tzuf Botzer (born 2 March 1994) is an Israeli tennis player.  He began playing for the Israel Davis Cup team at the age of 20, in 2014.

His career-high ranking in singles is World # 583, which he achieved on 17 February 2014.

Biography
Botzer was born in and resides in Tel Aviv, Israel.   He started playing tennis at age five.

Botzer played for the Israel Davis Cup team against Argentina in September 2014, at age 20 as a substitute for Amir Weintraub.  He lost singles matches to world # 25 Leonardo Mayer and world # 67 Carlos Berlocq.

Botzer played for the team against the Romania Davis Cup team in 2015, losing in singles to world # 159 Adrian Ungur and to world # 168 Marius Copil. In doubles, he and 17-year-old Edan Leshem lost to Florin Mergea (world doubles # 17) and Horia Tecau (world doubles # 9).

References

External links
 
 
 

1994 births
Living people
Sportspeople from Tel Aviv
Israeli male tennis players
Wake Forest Demon Deacons men's tennis players
Virginia Cavaliers men's tennis players